Philip William Wheeldon  (1913–1992) was the fourth Bishop of Whitby and twice Bishop of Kimberley and Kuruman.

Life
He was educated at Clifton College and then at Downing College, Cambridge, the college frequented by the family. He was ordained in 1938.  He sat for a number of portraits which are now housed in the National Portrait Gallery, London.

 After a curacy at Farnham he was commissioned as Chaplain to the Forces, Fourth Class on 12 October 1939, and served throughout the Second World War.  He was appointed Officer of the Order of the British Empire on 24 January 1946, for his service as Deputy Assistant Chaplain General to XII Corps from November 1944 (with the rank of Chaplain to the Forces, Second Class) in the Queen's Birthday Honours, and presented to him by Her Majesty Queen Elizabeth II. 

When peace came he was successively chaplain to the Archbishop of York, General Secretary of the Central Advisory Council on Training for the Ministry and finally Prebendary of Wells Cathedral.

In this post he served as the attendant of the Archbishop of York in the Coronation of Queen Elizabeth II before elevation to the Episcopate in October 1954. This was just prior to this Enthronement in 1954, as Bishop of Whitby.

After 7 years at Whitby he was translated to Kimberley and Kuruman in South Africa. He served twice as Bishop, retiring once through ill-health but returning when his successor Clarence Edward Crowther was deported. In retirement he served as an Assistant Bishop, firstly in the Diocese of Worcester and latterly at Wakefield.

In 1992, he died and his death was recorded by obituaries in the Telegraph and the Times newspapers.

Notes

1913 births
People educated at Clifton College
Alumni of Downing College, Cambridge
Bishops of Whitby
20th-century Anglican Church of Southern Africa bishops
Anglican bishops of Kimberley and Kuruman
1992 deaths
Officers of the Order of the British Empire
Royal Army Chaplains' Department officers
British Army personnel of World War II
World War II chaplains